Saed Ismael Díaz De León (born 23 June 1999) is a Panamanian footballer who plays as a forward for Tauro.

References

External links
Profile at Football Database

1999 births
Living people
Panamanian footballers
Panamanian expatriate footballers
Association football forwards
Tauro F.C. players
Philadelphia Union II players
Liga Panameña de Fútbol players
USL Championship players
Panamanian expatriate sportspeople in the United States
Expatriate soccer players in the United States
Sportspeople from Panama City
Panama under-20 international footballers